The 2019–20 Israel State Cup (Gvia HaMedina) was the 81st season of Israel's nationwide Association football cup competition and the 65th after the Israeli Declaration of Independence.

The competition started in August 2019.

Preliminary rounds

First to fourth rounds
Rounds 1 to 4 double as cup competition for each division in Liga Bet and Liga Gimel. The two third-Round winners from each Liga Bet division and the fourth-Round winner from each Liga Gimel division advance to the sixth Round.

Liga Bet
Two teams from each regional divisions qualified to the sixth round .

District cup and qualified Liga Bet

the Winner along with the Runners-up qualified to the sixth round

Liga Bet North A

Al-Nahda Nazareth won the district cup and qualified along with F.C. Bnei M.M.B.E. to the sixth round.

Liga Bet North B

Ironi Nesher won the district cup and qualified along with Maccabi Bnei Reineh to the sixth round.

Liga Bet South A

Beitar Kfar Saba won the district cup and qualified along with Beitar Ramat Gan to the sixth round.

Liga Bet South B

Maccabi Ironi Sderot won the district cup and qualified along with Maccabi Kiryat Malakhi to the sixth round.

Liga Gimel
One team from each regional divisions qualified to the sixth round .

District cup and qualified Liga Gimel

the Winner qualified to the sixth round

Liga Gimel Upper Galilee

Maccabi Ahva Sha'ab won the district cup and qualified to the sixth round.

Liga Gimel Lower Galilee

Bnei Shefa-'Amr won the district cup and qualified to the sixth round.

Liga Gimel Jezreel

Hapoel Ein as-Sahla won the district cup and qualified to the sixth round.

Liga Gimel Shomron

Maccabi Ironi Tirat HaCarmel won the district cup and qualified to the sixth round.

Liga Gimel Sharon

Tzeirei Tira won the district cup and qualified to the sixth round.

Liga Gimel Tel Aviv

Shikun Vatikim Ramat Gan won the district cup and qualified to the sixth round.

Liga Gimel Center

F.C. Ramla Gan won the district cup and qualified to the sixth round.

Liga Gimel South

F.C. Arad won the district cup and qualified to the sixth round.

Fifth round
The fifth Round is played within each division of Liga Alef. The winners qualify to the sixth Round

Sixth Round
The Sixth Round is played in two District area (North and South) within the team are qualify from the previous Rounds. The winners qualify to the seven Round

Seventh Round
Hapoel Katamon Jerusalem, Hapoel Bnei Lod, Hapoel Petah Tikva and Hapoel Afula were pre-qualified for the Next Round.

Eighth Round

Round of 16

Quarter-final

Semi-final

Final

Notes

References

External links
 Israel Football Association website 
 soccerway

State Cup
Israel State Cup seasons
Israel
Israel State Cup